Tytroca leucoptera is a moth of the family Noctuidae first described by George Hampson in 1896. It is found in the Arabian Peninsula and all deserts of North Africa.

There are multiple generations per year. Adults are on wing in October in Israel.

The larvae probably feed on Acacia species.

External links

Image

Catocalinae
Owlet moths of Africa
Moths of the Middle East
Moths described in 1896